Kvašov is a village and municipality in Púchov District in the Trenčín Region of north-western Slovakia.

History
In historical records the village was first mentioned in 1471.

Geography
The municipality lies at an altitude of 252 metres and covers an area of 7.468 km². It has a population of about 660 people.

External links
 
 
 https://web.archive.org/web/20070513023228/http://www.statistics.sk/mosmis/eng/run.html

Villages and municipalities in Púchov District